Byzantine fault tolerant protocols are algorithms that are robust to arbitrary types of failures in distributed algorithms. The Byzantine agreement protocol is an essential part of this task. The constant-time quantum version of the Byzantine protocol, is described below.

Introduction
The Byzantine Agreement protocol is a protocol in distributed computing.
It takes its name from a problem formulated by Lamport, Shostak and Pease in 1982, which itself is a reference to a historical problem.  The Byzantine army was divided into divisions with each division being led by a General with the following properties:

Each General is either loyal or a traitor to the Byzantine state.
All Generals communicate by sending and receiving messages.
There are only two commands: attack and retreat.
All loyal Generals should agree on the same plan of action: attack or retreat.
A small linear fraction of bad Generals should not cause the protocol to fail (less than a  fraction).
(See  for the proof of the impossibility result). 
The problem usually is equivalently restated in the form of a commanding General and loyal Lieutenants with the General being either loyal or a traitor and the same for the Lieutenants with the following properties.

All loyal Lieutenants carry out the same order.
If the commanding General is loyal, all loyal Lieutenants obey the order that he sends.
A strictly less than  fraction including the commanding General are traitors.

Byzantine failure and resilience
Failures in an algorithm or protocol can be categorized into three main types:
 A failure to take another execution step in the algorithm: This is usually referred to as a "fail stop" fault.
 A random failure to execute correctly: This is called a "random fault" or "random Byzantine" fault.
 An arbitrary failure where the algorithm fails to execute the steps correctly (usually in a clever way by some adversary to make the whole algorithm fail) which also encompasses the previous two types of faults; this is called a "Byzantine fault".

A Byzantine resilient or Byzantine fault tolerant protocol or algorithm is an algorithm that is robust to all the kinds of failures mentioned above. For example, given a space shuttle with multiple redundant processors, if the processors give conflicting data, which processors or sets of processors should be believed? The solution can be formulated as a Byzantine fault tolerant protocol.

Sketch of the algorithm
We will sketch here the asynchronous algorithm 
The algorithm works in two phases:
Phase 1 (Communication phase):
All messages are sent and received in this round.
A coin flipping protocol is a procedure that allows two parties A and B that do not trust each other to toss a coin to win a particular object.
There are two types of coin flipping protocols
 weak coin flipping protocols: The two players A and B initially start with no inputs and they are to compute some value  and be able to accuse anyone of cheating. The protocol is successful if A and B agree on the outcome. The outcome 0 is defined as A winning and 1 as B winning. The protocol has the following properties:
If one of the players is honest (i.e., the other player may deviate arbitrarily from the protocol in his or her local computation), then the other party wins with probability at most . In other words, if B is dishonest, then , and if A is dishonest, then .
 A strong coin flipping protocol: In a strong coin flipping protocol, the goal is instead to produce a random bit which is biased away from any particular value 0 or 1. Clearly, any strong coin flipping protocol with bias  leads to weak coin flipping with the same bias.

Verifiable secret sharing
 A verifiable secret sharing protocol: A (n,k) secret sharing protocol allows a set of n players to share a secret, s such that only a quorum of k or more players can discover the secret. The player sharing (distributing the secret pieces) the secret is usually referred to as the dealer. A verifiable secret sharing protocol differs from a basic secret sharing protocol in that players can verify that their shares are consistent even in the presence of a malicious dealer.

The fail-stop protocol

Protocol quantum coin flip for player 
Round 1 generate the GHZ state  on  qubits and send the th qubit to the th player keeping one part
Distribute the  qudits between all the players
 Receive the quantum messages from all players and wait for the next communication round, thus forcing the adversary to choose which messages were passed.
 Round 2: Measure (in the standard base) all  qubits received in round I. Select the player with the highest leader value (ties broken arbitrarily) as the "leader" of the round. Measure the leader's coin in the standard base.
 Set the output of the QuantumCoinFlip protocol:  = measurement outcome of the leader's coin.

The Byzantine protocol
To generate a random coin assign an integer in the range [0,n-1] to each player and each player is not allowed to choose its own 
random ID as each player  selects a random number  for every other player  and distributes  this using a verifiable secret sharing scheme.

At the end of this phase players agree on which secrets were properly shared, the secrets are then opened and each player  is assigned the value
 

This requires private information channels so we replace the random secrets by the superposition . In which the state is encoded using a quantum verifiable secret sharing protocol (QVSS). We cannot distribute the state  since the bad players can collapse the state. To prevent bad players from doing so we encode the state using the Quantum verifiable secret sharing (QVSS) and send each player their share of the secret. Here again the verification requires Byzantine Agreement, but replacing the agreement by the grade-cast protocol is enough.

Grade-cast protocol

A grade-cast protocol has the following properties using the definitions in 
Informally, a graded broadcast protocol is a protocol with a designated player called “dealer” (the one who broadcasts) such that:
 If the dealer is good, all the players get the same message.
 Even if the dealer is bad, if some good player accepts the message, all the good players get the same message (but they may or may not accept it).
A protocol P is said to be achieve graded broadcast if, at the beginning of the protocol, a designated player D (called the dealer) holds a value v, and at the end of the protocol, every player  outputs a pair  such that the following properties hold: 

If D is honest, then  = v and  = 2 for every honest player .

For  the verification stage of the QVSS protocol guarantees that for a good dealer the correct state will be encoded, and that for any, possibly faulty dealer, some particular state will be recovered during the recovery stage. We note that for the purpose of our Byzantine quantum coin flip protocol the recovery stage is much simpler. Each player measures his share of the QVSS and sends the classical value to all other players. The verification stage guarantees, with high probability, that in the presence of up to  faulty players all the good players will recover the same classical value (which is the same value that would result from a direct measurement of the encoded state).

Remarks 
In 2007, a quantum protocol for Byzantine Agreement was demonstrated experimentally  using a four-photon polarization-entangled state. This shows that the quantum implementation of classical Byzantine Agreement protocols is indeed feasible.

References 

Quantum mechanics
Cryptography
Distributed computing problems
Fault tolerance
Engineering failures
Theory of computation